No In was one of the four members (No In, Han Eum, Sam and Wang Gyeop) who operated the government of Wiman Joseon. His position was a chancellor and he was in charge of politics of Wiman Joseon. Since No In had a family name, it is believed that he was an exile from China or person related to China. Just like his master Ugeo who was the last king of Wiman Joseon. In BC 109 to 108, when Han dynasty attacked Wiman Joseon, he was surrendered instantly together with those exiles from China, Han Eum and Wang Gyeop while leaving the King of Wiman Joseon Ugeo. He died on the way to surrender. Even after Uego's death, some ministers of Wiman Joseon resisted to Han dynasty. Han dynasty sent Wi Jang and No Choe then killed those ministers. Choe was a son of No In.

Family
Son: No Choe

See also
Han conquest of Gojoseon

References

Sources

註 042

Wiman Joseon people
Korean people of Chinese descent
Korean politicians
Year of birth unknown
108 BC deaths
2nd-century BC Korean people